László Kormos (born 24 June 1986 in Mezőtúr) is a Hungarian football player who currently plays for Ceglédi VSE.

External links
 Profile at HLSZ 

1986 births
Living people
People from Mezőtúr
Hungarian footballers
Association football midfielders
Kecskeméti TE players
Szolnoki MÁV FC footballers
Vecsés FC footballers
Bajai LSE footballers
Ceglédi VSE footballers
Nemzeti Bajnokság I players
Sportspeople from Jász-Nagykun-Szolnok County